The 2011 Andorran local elections were held on 4 December. Voters elected the representatives of the seven parishes.

Electoral system
Voters elected the members of the municipal councils (consells de comú in Catalan). The electoral law allow the municipal councils to choose their number of seats, which must be an even number between 10 and 16.

All city council members were elected in single multi-member districts, consisting of the parish territory, using closed lists. Half of the seats are allocated to the party with more votes. The other half of the seats were allocated using the Hare quota (including the winning party).

The cònsol major (mayor) and the cònsol menor (deputy mayor) were elected indirectly by the municipal councilors after the election.

Results

Overall

Canillo

Encamp

Ordino

La Massana

Andorra la Vella

Sant Julià de Lòria

Escaldes-Engordany

Notes

References

External links
Government election website

2011
Andorran local elections
Local elections
Andorran local elections